Isaac Asante (born 21 August 2002) is a Ghanaian professional footballer who plays as a midfielder for Belgian National Division 1 club OH Leuven U23.

Club career
Asante made his professional debut for OH Leuven on 15 August 2020 in a 1–1 draw against Genk. In July 2022, Asante was sent to the OH Leuven under-23 side in the Belgian third tier for the season.  He scored his first goal for the under-23 in a 1–1 match against  KSK Heist on 10 September.

Personal life
Born in Accra, Ghana, Asante moved to Belgium with his family at a young age.

Career statistics

Club

References

External links

 FDB Profile

2002 births
Living people
Footballers from Accra
Ghanaian footballers
Belgian footballers
Ghanaian emigrants to Belgium
Belgian people of Ghanaian descent
Black Belgian sportspeople
Association football midfielders
Oud-Heverlee Leuven players
Belgian Pro League players
Challenger Pro League players